"If Looks Could Kill" is a song written and recorded by American country music artist Rodney Crowell.  It was released in January 1990 as the second single from Crowell's album Keys to the Highway.  The song reached number 6 on the Billboard Hot Country Singles & Tracks chart in May 1990 and number 4 on the RPM Country Tracks chart in Canada.

Chart performance

Year-end charts

References

1990 singles
Rodney Crowell songs
Songs written by Rodney Crowell
Song recordings produced by Tony Brown (record producer)
Columbia Records singles
1989 songs